Luka Predanić (11 September 1905 – 8 July 1996) was a Yugoslav middle-distance runner. He competed in the men's 1500 metres at the 1928 Summer Olympics.

References

1905 births
1996 deaths
Athletes (track and field) at the 1928 Summer Olympics
Yugoslav male middle-distance runners
Olympic athletes of Yugoslavia
Place of birth missing